Gwiaździsta eskadra (The Starry Squadron) is a lost 1930 Polish war film directed by Leonard Buczkowski. Shot with the co-operation of the Polish army, it was the most expensive Polish film made before World War II. It was first released as silent film, before later being re-released with sound.

Plot
Gwiaździsta eskadra told the romantic story of love between a Polish girl and an American volunteer pilot in the Polish 7th Air Escadrille (better known as the Kościuszko Squadron) during the Polish-Soviet War of 1919–1921. The story was inspired by the actual life of Merian C. Cooper, a Polish Air Force officer during the war, but much better known for his later career as an adventurer, director, screenwriter and producer.

Cooper fathered Polish translator and writer Maciej Słomczyński during his time in Poland.

Loss of film copies
All copies of this film were destroyed during the Soviet occupation of Poland after World War II.

Cast 
 Barbara Orwid - as Lili
 Jana Krysta - as Zofia
 Jerzy Kobusz - as Bond
 Janusz Halny - as Woyda
 Stefan Szwarc
 Andrzej Karewicz
 Barbara Ludwiżanka
 Zygmunt Biesiadecki

References

External links 
Starry Squadron: The Polish Film That Never Was on Culture.pl

film still

1930 films
Lost Polish films
Polish war films
1930s Polish-language films
Aviation films
Polish black-and-white films
Polish silent films
Polish–Soviet War
1930 war films
1930 lost films